Fernando Gómez Doblas (born 16 October 1965 in Málaga) is a track and field athlete from Spain with cerebral palsy.  He competes as a T36 type athlete.  He competed at the 1996 Summer Paralympics in Atlanta, Georgia, winning a silver in the 400 meter T34-T35 race, the 200 meter T34-T35 race and the 100 meter T35 race.   He competed at the 2000 Summer Paralympics in Sydney, Australia, where he did not meal in any of his races.

Fernando competed in two Paralympics, firstly in 1996 where he won silver each of the individual 100m, 200m and 400m and was part of the Spanish 4 × 100 m relay team that failed to finish.  The following games in 2000 he again competed in the three sprint events and this time both relays but despite making the final in each event failed to add to his medal tally.

References

External links
 
 

1965 births
Living people
Spanish male sprinters
Paralympic silver medalists for Spain
Athletes (track and field) at the 1996 Summer Paralympics
Athletes (track and field) at the 2000 Summer Paralympics
Cerebral Palsy category Paralympic competitors
Paralympic athletes of Spain
Spanish disability athletes
Sportsmen with disabilities
Medalists at the 1996 Summer Paralympics
Paralympic medalists in athletics (track and field)